The Seine at Argenteuil is an 1873 oil painting by Claude Monet, one of a series of paintings the artist made of the area.

The painting is held in a private collection.

In popular culture
The Seine at Argenteuil was featured in and provided (along with other Monet paintings) the title inspiration for the 2001 film Vanilla Sky. In the film the main character, David (Tom Cruise), owns the painting, and his subconscious makes use of its depiction of the sky.

1873 paintings
Argenteuil
Paintings by Claude Monet
Water in art